Calamotropha brevistrigellus is a moth in the family Crambidae. It was described by Aristide Caradja in 1932. It is found in China (Guangdong, Lianping) and Japan.

Subspecies
Calamotropha brevistrigellus brevistrigellus
Calamotropha brevistrigellus maenamii Inoue, 1982 (Japan)

References

Crambinae
Moths described in 1932